Richteria is a genus of Asian flowering plants in the daisy family. Described in 1842, the genus is named after botanist Alexander Richter.

 Species
 Richteria djilgense (Franch.) K.Bremer & Humphries  - Afghanistan
 Richteria leontopodium Winkl.  - Kyrgyzstan, Xinjiang, Kazakhstan, Uzbekistan, Siberia
 Richteria pyrethroides Kar. & Kir. - Afghanistan

References

Anthemideae
Asteraceae genera